Michael Doherty may refer to:

Sports
 Michael Doherty (footballer) (born 1990), Scottish footballer
 Mike Doherty (born 1961), English footballer

Others
 Michael Doherty (Irish politician) (1933–2011), Irish Fianna Fáil politician
 Michael F. Doherty (born 1951), British chemical engineer
 Michael J. Doherty (born 1963), American politician, member of the New Jersey Senate
 Michael Doherty (legal scholar), professor of law

See also
 Michael O'Doherty (disambiguation)
 Michael Doherty White, U.S. Representative
 Mick Docherty (born 1950), English former footballer and trainer
 Mike Docherty (1955–2016), Scottish comic book and animation artist